The Mayor of Gorizia is an elected politician who, along with the Gorizia's City Council, is accountable for the strategic government of Gorizia in Friuli-Venezia Giulia, Italy. The current Mayor is Rodolfo Ziberna, a member of the centre-right party Forza Italia, who took office on 26 June 2017.

Overview
According to the Italian Constitution, the Mayor of Gorizia is member of the City Council.

The Mayor is elected by the population of Gorizia, who also elects the members of the City Council, controlling the Mayor's policy guidelines and is able to enforce his resignation by a motion of no confidence. The Mayor is entitled to appoint and release the members of his government.

Since 1994 the Mayor is elected directly by Gorizia's electorate: in all mayoral elections in Italy in cities with a population higher than 15,000 the voters express a direct choice for the mayor or an indirect choice voting for the party of the candidate's coalition. If no candidate receives at least 50% of votes, the top two candidates go to a second round after two weeks. The election of the City Council is based on a direct choice for the candidate with a preference vote: the candidate with the majority of the preferences is elected. The number of the seats for each party is determined proportionally.

Kingdom of Italy (1918–1946)
The office of Mayor of Gorizia was established in 1918 and it was elected by the City's Council. In 1926, the Fascist dictatorship abolished mayors and City councils, replacing them with an authoritarian Podestà chosen by the National Fascist Party. The office of Mayor was restored in 1945 during the Allied occupation.

Timeline

Italian Republic (since 1946)

City Council election (1948–1994)
From 1948 to 1994, the Mayor of Gorizia was elected by the City's Council.

Direct election (since 1994)
Since 1994, under provisions of new local administration law, the Mayor of Gorizia is chosen by direct election.

Timeline

References

External links

Gorizia
Mayors of places in Friuli-Venezia Giulia
People from Gorizia
Politics of Friuli-Venezia Giulia
Gorizia